The Album de la Pléiade is a book published every year in May by the "Bibliothèque de la Pléiade", a series of classic French and international texts by French publishing house éditions Gallimard. It is usually about an author published in the series, although occasionally about a collective from a specific time period (1961 recording and 1989 album) or an important topic of the collection (1970 and 2009 albums).

Featured authors are generally chosen upon their entry in the series or a major addition of their works.

Each album is richly illustrated and focusses on iconography, with an accompanying bibliographical text by a renowned specialist of the selected author. It is produced in the same format, leather-bound cover and gold lettering as volumes of the Bibliothèque de la Pléiade, but has generally fewer pages and is printed on thicker paper to allow the inclusion of many colour images.

The Albums are not for sale. They are offered by the booksellers to customers who purchase three books from the collection. They tend to be distributed very quickly and immediately become collectors' items. Because of this, the most popular books of the collection such as, among others, Album Proust (1965), Album Céline (1977) or Album Balzac (1962) can only be obtained on reselling markets at high prices (often found around $200–$300). The older (1960s-1970s) books are also often high priced due to their rarity, even if the author is less popular. The oldest, Dictionnaire des auteurs de la Pléiade (Dictionary of the Authors of the Pléiade), published in 1960 has always been the most expensive, selling for over $400–$450.

List of the albums 
Here is a list of the Album de la Pléiade:

Notes and references 

Series of books